Remi Moreno Flores (born 13 November 1988) is a French sport shooter.

He participated at the 2018 ISSF World Shooting Championships, winning a gold medal.

References

External links

Living people
1988 births
French male sport shooters
ISSF rifle shooters
Sportspeople from Créteil
Universiade gold medalists for France
Universiade medalists in shooting
Medalists at the 2015 Summer Universiade
21st-century French people